The canton of Mirande-Astarac is an administrative division of the Gers department, southwestern France. It was created at the French canton reorganisation which came into effect in March 2015. Its seat is in Mirande.

It consists of the following communes:
 
Aux-Aussat
Barcugnan
Bazugues
Beccas
Belloc-Saint-Clamens
Berdoues
Betplan
Castex
Clermont-Pouyguillès
Duffort
Estampes
Haget
Idrac-Respaillès
Laas
Labéjan
Lagarde-Hachan
Laguian-Mazous
Lamazère
Loubersan
Malabat
Manas-Bastanous
Marseillan
Miélan
Miramont-d'Astarac
Mirande
Moncassin
Montaut
Mont-de-Marrast
Montégut-Arros
Ponsampère
Sadeillan
Sainte-Aurence-Cazaux
Sainte-Dode
Saint-Élix-Theux
Saint-Martin
Saint-Maur
Saint-Médard
Saint-Michel
Saint-Ost
Sarraguzan
Sauviac
Villecomtal-sur-Arros
Viozan

References

Cantons of Gers